Modern Buddhism may refer to:

Contemporary Buddhism
Buddhist modernism, new movements based on modern era reinterpretations of Buddhism
Buddhism in the West
Buddhism in Europe
Buddhism in the United States